Caffè Italia, Montréal is a Canadian docudrama film, directed by Paul Tana and released in 1985. Focusing on the Italian Canadian community in Montreal, Quebec, the film profiles the community's history through a mix of archival footage and historical reenactments of key events acted by a cast led by Pierre Curzi and Tony Nardi.

The film won the Prix L.-E.-Ouimet-Molson from the Association québécoise des critiques de cinéma for 1985.

References

External links

1985 films
Canadian docudrama films
Films shot in Quebec
Films set in Quebec
Films directed by Paul Tana
Italian-language Canadian films
French-language Canadian films
1980s Canadian films